Meclov is a municipality and village in Domažlice District in the Plzeň Region of the Czech Republic. It has about 1,200 inhabitants.

Administrative parts
Villages of Bozdíš, Březí, Jeníkovice, Mašovice, Mračnice, Mrchojedy, Němčice and Třebnice are administrative parts of Meclov.

References

Villages in Domažlice District